Sin and Bones is the fifth album, and third album of all original material, from the heavy metal band Fozzy. It was released on August 14, 2012 through Century Media Records.

Background
Lead singer Chris Jericho commented on the album "It's the typical cliché, but Sin and Bones really is the best thing we've ever done. We've taken the heavy yet ultra-melodic style that has become Fozzy's trademark to the next level and I guarantee these songs will blow all of you away!" At the pre-show to the Metal Hammer awards on June 11, Fozzy performed a new song set to be on the album called "Sandpaper". During an interview at the 2012 Download festival, Jericho also stated that the band wanted to make Sin and Bones their Black Album in reference to Metallica's critically acclaimed self-titled album that sent them into the mainstream.

Reception

Fozzy's album, Sin and Bones, premiered at #1 on the Billboard Heatseekers chart and marks the band's best-selling first week ever for an album of entirely original material. Released on August 14, the album also celebrates the band's first appearance on the Billboard Top 200 chart, where it landed at #143. Ultimate-Guitar.com declared Fozzy as "one of the best metal bands out there right now," Revolver Magazine called Sin and Bones "Fozzy's best album yet," and Metal Hammer (UK) said, "Sin and Bones is impressive, diverse and mature... this is a masterclass that should take Fozzy on to bigger things."

Track listing

Charts

Personnel

Musicians

 Chris Jericho – lead vocals, piano
 Rich Ward – guitar, backing vocals
 Paul Di Leo – bass
 Frank Fontsere – drums
 Billy Grey  – guitar

Additional musicians

 M. Shadows – additional vocals on "Sandpaper"
 Phil Campbell – guitar solo on "She's My Addiction"

References

External links
 Official website
 Century Media Records official website

2012 albums
Century Media Records albums
Fozzy albums